is the 53rd single by the J-pop girl group Morning Musume, released in Japan on April 17, 2013.

Release details
This is Morning Musume's third double A-side single, following "Kono Chikyū no Heiwa o Honki de Negatterun Da yo! / Kare to Issho ni Omise ga Shitai!" and "One Two Three / The Matenrō Show", and the final single to feature sixth generation member Reina Tanaka, who announced that she would graduate at the end of the group's spring tour.

The "Loose Shot Ver." of "Brainstorming" was uploaded to the official Morning Musume YouTube channel on February 27, 2013, while the Dance Shot of "Kimi Sae Ireba Nani mo Iranai" followed on March 13, 2013. The full versions of each video were uploaded to the channel on March 30 and April 10, respectively, with both English and Japanese subtitles.

The single will be released in seven versions: regular editions A and B and five limited editions: A, B, C, D, and E. The Limited Editions A, B, and C will come with a bonus DVD, while all the other editions will be CD-only. Each limited edition will also include an entry card for the lottery to win a launch event ticket.

After the graduation of Reina, Mizuki Fukumura and Masaki Sato received her lines.

Members at time of single 
 6th generation: Sayumi Michishige, Reina Tanaka 
 9th generation: Mizuki Fukumura, Erina Ikuta, Riho Sayashi, Kanon Suzuki
 10th generation: Haruna Iikubo, Ayumi Ishida, Masaki Sato, Haruka Kudo
 11th generation: Sakura Oda

Brainstorming Vocalists

Main Voc: Reina Tanaka, Riho Sayashi

Center Voc: Sayumi Michishige, Mizuki Fukumura, Haruna Iikubo, Ayumi Ishida, Masaki Sato, Sakura Oda

Minor Voc: Erina Ikuta, Kanon Suzuki, Haruka Kudo

Kimi Sae Ireba Nani mo Iranai Vocalists

Main Voc: Reina Tanaka, Riho Sayashi

Center Voc: Ayumi Ishida, Sakura Oda

Minor Voc: Sayumi Michishige, Mizuki Fukumura,  Erina Ikuta, Kanon Suzuki, Haruna Iikubo, Masaki Sato Haruka Kudo

Track listing

Regular Edition A

Limited Editions A, B, C, Regular Edition B

Limited Edition D

Limited Edition E

Bonus
Sealed into all the Limited Editions
 Event ticket lottery card with a serial number

Charts

References

External links
 Official page 
 Profile on the Hello! Project official website - Hello! Project 
 Profile on the Up-Front Works official website - Up-Front Works 

2013 singles
Japanese-language songs
Morning Musume songs
Songs written by Tsunku
Song recordings produced by Tsunku
Zetima Records singles
Oricon Weekly number-one singles
2013 songs
House music songs
Japanese synth-pop songs
Dance-pop songs